Internet Australia (previously known as the Internet Society of Australia) is the not-for-profit peak body representing everyone who uses the Internet. It is a broad member-based organisation not an industry lobby group. Its mission statement is Helping Shape Our Internet Future. It is the Australian chapter of the global Internet Society, often referred to as ISOC.

The organisation has been in existence since 1996. Internet Australia has made submissions and appeared before a range of inquiries held by the Australian Parliament. In 2015 Internet Australia organised the creation of a group called Parliamentary Friends of the Internet designed to provide a forum for providing information and guidance to MPs and Senators.

The organisation changed its name from Internet Society of Australia to Internet Australia. President George Fong commented at the time on the change "is designed to give the Society a more contemporary image in keeping with the board's determination to take a higher profile in fostering informed debate about Internet related issues."

In September 2017 five of the board of Directors of Internet Australia indicated they would not seek re-election to allow the entity to renew itself.

The current Internet Australia Chair is Dr Paul Brooks. Dr Books was outspoken on the previous direction of Internet Australia and the outgoing executive director Laurie Patton.

See also

Electronic Frontiers Australia
Internet in Australia

References

External links

Internet in Australia
1996 establishments in Australia
Organizations established in 1996
Organisations based in Sydney